Pseudemathis is a monotypic genus of African jumping spiders containing the single species, Pseudemathis trifida. It was first described by Eugène Louis Simon in 1902, and is found only in Africa. The name is a combination of the Ancient Greek "pseudo-", meaning "false", and the salticid genus name Emathis.

References

Monotypic Salticidae genera
Salticidae
Spiders of Africa